Julien Delétraz (born 9 December 1985) is a retired French professional footballer who played as a midfielder.

Professional career
Delétraz is a youth academy product of Grenoble and had 3 stints with the club. He debuted in the Ligue 2 on 20 May 2005 against AS Nancy.

In January 2019, he moved to Cannes.

Honours
 Singapore Premier League: 2010

References

External links
 
 
 Foot National Profile

1985 births
Living people
Sportspeople from La Tronche
French footballers
Association football midfielders
Grenoble Foot 38 players
Singapore Premier League players
Tours FC players
AS Cannes players
Ligue 2 players
Championnat National players
Championnat National 2 players
French expatriate footballers
French expatriate sportspeople in Singapore
Expatriate footballers in Singapore
Étoile FC players
Footballers from Auvergne-Rhône-Alpes